The Association of Tennis Professionals (ATP) Tour is the elite tour for professional tennis organized by the ATP. The ATP Tour includes the Grand Slam tournaments (organized by the International Tennis Federation (ITF)), the ATP Super 9, the ATP Championship Series, the ATP World Series, the ATP World Team Cup, the Davis Cup (organized by the ITF), the ATP Tour World Championships and the Grand Slam Cup (organized by the ITF).

Schedule 
This is the complete schedule of events on the 1996 ATP Tour, with player progression documented from the quarterfinals stage.

Key

January

February

March

April

May

June

July

August

September

October

November

December

ATP rankings

Statistical information 
List of players and singles titles won:
  Andre Agassi - Miami Masters, Atlanta Olympics, Cincinnati Masters (3)
  Karim Alami - Atlanta, Palermo (2)
  Boris Becker - Australian Open, London, Vienna, Stuttgart Masters, Grand Slam Cup (5)
  Byron Black - Seoul (1)
  Alberto Berasategui - Bologna, Kitzbühel, Bucharest (3)
  Tomás Carbonell - Casablanca (1)
  Roberto Carretero - Hamburg Masters (1)
  Michael Chang - Indian Wells Masters, Washington, D.C., Los Angeles (3)
  Francisco Clavet - Amsterdam (1)
  Albert Costa - Gstaad, San Marino, Bournemouth (3)
  Jim Courier - Philadelphia (1)
  Slava Doseděl - Munich (1)
  Thomas Enqvist - New Delhi, Paris Masters, Stockholm (3)
  Wayne Ferreira - Scottsdale, Canada Masters (2)
  Guy Forget - Marseille (1)
  Marc-Kevin Goellner - Marbella (1)
  Hernán Gumy - Santiago (1)
  Magnus Gustafsson - Saint Petersburg, Båstad (2)
  Goran Ivanišević - Zagreb, Dubai, Milan, Rotterdam, Moscow (5)
  Yevgeny Kafelnikov - Adelaide, Prague, French Open, Lyon (4)
  Petr Korda - Doha (1)
  Richard Krajicek - Wimbledon (1)
  Nicklas Kulti - Halle (1)
  Félix Mantilla - Oporto (1)
  Todd Martin - Sydney Outdoor (1)
  Andrei Medvedev - Long Island (1)
  Fernando Meligeni - Pinehurst (1)
  Carlos Moyà - Umag (1)
  Thomas Muster - Mexico City, Estoril, Barcelona, Monte Carlo Masters, Rome Masters, Stuttart Outdoor, Bogotá (7)
  Jiří Novák - Auckland (1)
  Andrei Olhovskiy - Shanghai (1)
  Alex O'Brien - New Haven (1)
  Nicolas Pereira - Newport (1)
  Mark Philippoussis - Toulouse (1)
  Cédric Pioline - Copenhagen (1)
  David Prinosil - Ostrava (1)
  Richey Reneberg - Rosmalen (1)
  Marcelo Ríos - St. Poelten (1)
  Pete Sampras - San Jose, Memphis, Hong Kong, Tokyo, Indianapolis, US Open, Basel, ATP Championships (8)
  Javier Sánchez - Tel Aviv (1)
  Sjeng Schalken - Jakarta (1)
  Jan Siemerink - Nottingham (1)
  Jonathan Stark - Singapore (1)
  Greg Rusedski - Beijing (1)
  Michael Stich - Antwerp (1)
  Jason Stoltenberg - Coral Springs (1)
  MaliVai Washington - Bermuda (1)

Titles won by nation:
  20 (Sydney Outdoor, San Jose, Memphis, Philadelphia, Indian Wells Masters, Miami Masters, Hong Kong, Bermuda, Tokyo, Rosmalen, Washington, D.C., Atlanta Olympics, Los Angeles, Cincinnati Masters, Indianapolis, New Haven, US Open, Basel, Singapore, ATP Championships)
  12 (Casablanca, Hamburg Masters, Oporto, Bologna, Gstaad, Kitzbühel, Amsterdam, San Marino, Umag, Bucharest, Bournemouth, Tel Aviv)
  7 (Mexico City, Estoril, Barcelona, Monte Carlo Masters, Rome Masters, Stuttgart Outdoor, Bogotá)
  7 (Australian Open, Antwerp, London, Marbella, Vienna, Ostrava, Stuttgart Masters)
  6 (Saint Petersburg, New Delhi, Halle, Båstad, Paris Masters, Stockholm)
  5 (Zagreb, Dubai, Milan, Rotterdam, Moscow)
  5 (Adelaide, Shanghai, Prague, French Open, Lyon)
  3 (Auckland, Doha, Prague)
  3 (Jakarta, Nottingham, Wimbledon)
  2 (Coral Springs, Toulouse)
  2 (Marseille, Copenhagen)
  2 (Atlanta, Palermo)
  2 (Scottsdale, Canada Masters)
  1 (Santiago)
  1 (Pinehurst)
  1 (St. Poelten)
  1 (Beijing)
  1 (Long Island)
  1 (Newport)
  1 (Seoul)

The following players won their first career title:
  Karim Alami - Atlanta
  Byron Black - Seoul
  Roberto Carretero - Hamburg Masters
  Hernán Gumy - Santiago
  Félix Mantilla - Oporto
  Jiří Novák - Auckland
  Mark Philippoussis - Toulouse
  Cédric Pioline - Copenhagen

See also 
 1996 WTA Tour

References

External links 
 Association of Tennis Professionals (ATP) official website
 1996 ATP Tour draws

 
ATP Tour
ATP Tour seasons